3RR may refer to:
3-ring release system, a parachute component used by sport skydivers
3rd Ring Road (Beijing), a road that encircles the center of Beijing, China
Third-round reversal, a draft method used in some American fantasy football leagues